Krishan Dutt Sultanpuri  was an Indian politician. He was elected to the Lok Sabha, lower house of the Parliament of India from the Shimla constituency of Himachal Pradesh in 1980, 1984, 1989, 1991, 1996 and 1998 as a member of the Indian National Congress. He was a member of the Himachal Pradesh Legislative Assembly  from Solan in 1972 as an Independent candidate. Mr. Sultanpuri belong to the Koli caste of Himachal Pradesh and was close aid to former Indian President Ram Nath Kovind.

References

External links
 Official biographical sketch in Parliament of India website

Lok Sabha members from Himachal Pradesh
India MPs 1980–1984
India MPs 1984–1989
India MPs 1989–1991
India MPs 1991–1996
India MPs 1996–1997
India MPs 1998–1999
1932 births
2006 deaths
Indian National Congress politicians